Area code 413 (LATA code 126) is a telephone area code in the North American Numbering Plan (NANP) for the western third of Massachusetts. It is the largest numbering plan area in the Commonwealth, and extends from the New York state line eastward into Worcester County (only the towns of Hardwick and Warren), while excluding the Franklin County towns of Orange, New Salem, Warwick, and Wendell, which use the overlay of area codes 978 and 351. The most-populous city of area code 413 is Springfield. 413 also includes Great Barrington, Greenfield, North Adams, Northampton  and Pittsfield.

History
In the preliminary model of the North American Numbering Plan, Massachusetts was allotted two area codes, the only state in New England to be split between multiple numbering plan areas. Area code 413 was intended for use in Pennsylvania.  When the area code map was finalized, Massachusetts remained split between two numbering plan areas. However, the eastern two-thirds of the state (including Boston and Worcester) was assigned 617, with 413 in the west.

Because of the low population density of western Massachusetts, 413 remained in its original configuration even as the eastern portion of the state went from one area code to four from 1988 to 1997.  As a result, 413 is the only original numbering plan area of Massachusetts that still maintains its original boundaries, and is one of the few original area codes (not counting those that cover an entire state) that has never been split or overlaid despite the proliferation of cell phones and pagers, particularly in and around Springfield. The projected exhaust date for 413 is 2041.

Service area

Cities and towns

 Adams
 Agawam
 Alford
 Amherst
 Ashfield
 Becket
 Belchertown
 Bernardston
 Blandford
 Brimfield
 Buckland
 Charlemont
 Cheshire
 Chester
 Chesterfield
 Chicopee
 Clarksburg
 Colrain
 Conway
 Cummington
 Dalton
 Deerfield
 Easthampton
 East Longmeadow
 Egremont
 Erving
 Florida
 Gill
 Goshen
 Granville
 Great Barrington
 Greenfield
 Hadley
 Hampden
 Hancock
 Hardwick
 Hatfield
 Hawley
 Heath
 Hinsdale
 Holland
 Holyoke
 Huntington
 Lanesborough
 Lee
 Lenox
 Leverett
 Leyden
 Longmeadow
 Ludlow
 Middlefield
 Monroe
 Monson
 Montague
 Monterey
 Montgomery
 Mount Washington
 New Ashford
 New Marlborough
 Northampton
 Northfield
 Otis
 Palmer
 Pelham
 Peru
 Pittsfield
 Plainfield
 Richmond
 Rowe
 Russell
 Sandisfield
 Savoy
 Sheffield
 Shelburne
 Shutesbury
 South Hadley
 Southampton
 Southwick
 Springfield
 Sunderland
 Stockbridge
 Tyringham
 Tolland
 Wales
 Ware
 Warren
 Washington
 Westfield
 Westhampton
 West Springfield
 West Stockbridge
 Whately
 Wilbraham
 Williamsburg
 Williamstown
 Windsor
 Worthington

Counties
 Berkshire County
 Hampden County
 Hampshire County
 Franklin County (except for Orange,  New Salem, Warwick, and Wendell)
 Worcester County (Hardwick and Warren only)

See also
List of area codes in Massachusetts
List of NANP area codes
North American Numbering Plan

References

External links

 Massachusetts Area Code Map, Mass. Department of Telecommunications and Cable
 List of exchanges from AreaCodeDownload.com, 413 Area Code

413
413
413
Telecommunications-related introductions in 1947